Amselina emir is a moth of the family Autostichidae which can be found in Greece and Asia Minor.

References

Moths described in 1961
Moths of Europe
Amselina
Insects of Turkey